Rock Township may refer to:

in the United States
 Rock Township, Cherokee County, Iowa
 Rock Township, Lyon County, Iowa
 Rock Township, Mitchell County, Iowa
 Rock Township, Sioux County, Iowa, in Sioux County, Iowa
 Rock Township, Woodbury County, Iowa
 Rock Township, Marshall County, Kansas
 Rock Township, Pipestone County, Minnesota
 Rock Township, Jefferson County, Missouri
 Rock Township, Benson County, North Dakota
 Rock Township, Grant County, North Dakota, in Grant County, North Dakota

See also
 Rock Island Township (disambiguation)
 Township (disambiguation)
 Rock (disambiguation)

Township name disambiguation pages